Mildred Frances Cook (January 14, 1924 – January 11, 2023), known professionally as Carole Cook, was an American actress, active on screen and stage, best known for appearances on Lucille Ball's light entertainment comedy television series The Lucy Show and Here's Lucy.

Her best known film roles include The Incredible Mr. Limpet, American Gigolo and Sixteen Candles.

Biography

Early life
Mildred Frances Cook was born on January 14, 1924, in Abilene, Texas, one of four children of Leland Preston (L.P.) Cook Sr. and his wife, Maudine. She studied Greek drama at Baylor University. After graduating in 1945, she worked in regional theater. By 1954, she had moved to New York, where she made her theatrical debut.

Lucille Ball, having recently seen her success, in a stage production of Annie Get Your Gun, invited her to work for her production company Desilu Studios and changed her stage name to Carole, after her favourite actress  Carole Lombard.

Film and television
She appeared in such feature films as The Incredible Mr. Limpet, American Gigolo, Sixteen Candles, Grandview, U.S.A., Summer Lovers, and Palm Springs Weekend.

She made guest appearances on such television shows as The Lucy Show, Here's Lucy, Darkroom, Knight Rider, Emergency!, Magnum, P.I., McMillan and Wife, Murder, She Wrote, Dynasty, Charlie's Angels, Cagney & Lacey, Grey's Anatomy, and a starring role in a Season 4 episode of Hart to Hart.

Cook starred in the animated Walt Disney Pictures film Home on the Range voicing Pearl Gesner.

Theatre
In addition to her film and television work, Cook appeared in the original Broadway productions of 42nd Street and Romantic Comedy, and was the second actress (after Carol Channing) to star as Dolly Levi in Hello, Dolly!

She made her theatrical debut playing Mrs. Peacham in the 1956 off-Broadway production of The Threepenny Opera, starring Lotte Lenya.

Personal life
On September 9, 2018, a reporter from TMZ approached Cook to ask her opinion about an actor who grabbed a Trump 2020 sign from someone who had held it up in the audience during a performance of the musical Frozen. She replied "Where's John Wilkes Booth when you need him?" Someone off camera questioned "So we need to kill President Trump?", to which she replied "Why not?" Cook's comment received widespread attention and criticism.

She was married to actor and writer Tom Troupe from 1964 until her death. Lucille Ball was her matron of honor.

Cook died from heart failure in Beverly Hills, California, on January 11, 2023.

Filmography

Film

Television

Theatre

References

External links
 
 
 
 

1924 births
2023 deaths
20th-century American actresses
21st-century American actresses
Actresses from Texas
American film actresses
American musical theatre actresses
American television actresses
People from Abilene, Texas
HIV/AIDS activists